The Arab satellite lists, Arab lists, or satellite parties were Israeli Arab satellite parties formed for the purposes of electoral support of Mapai (and later the Labor Party), and other Zionist parties between 1948 and the mid-1970s. Between the 1949 elections and the 1969 elections, most of the Israeli Arab vote was divided between the communist parties Maki and Rakah and the Arab satellite lists. According to Israeli scholar Rebecca Kook, Maki and Rakah were considered the only parties to truly represent Arab interests until the Progressive List for Peace won two seats in the 1984 elections.

The existence of the Arab lists was partially because Arabs were barred from membership of Mapai until 1973. Unlike normal political parties, they were not active between elections. Most of the lists survived more than one term, and all were subservient to the policies of their patron Mapai.

According to Ilana Kaufman, the Arab lists; "were not proper parties but ad hoc electoral arrangements for the election of Arabs to the Knesset." Majid Al Haj writes that the object of the lists "was not the political mobilization of the Arab populations but rather the capture of Arab votes."

The Labor Party withdrew its support from its last satellite list, the United Arab List, prior to the 1981 elections. The Alignment, an alliance of the Labor Party and Mapam, saw its share of the Arab vote triple in the elections, whilst the UAL failed to cross the electoral threshold. The Arab Democratic Party, established in 1988 as a breakaway from the Labor Party, effectively took their place in the political sphere.

List of Arab satellite lists

Elections

The table below shows the votes of Arab-Israelis for Arab-led political parties, Jewish-led political parties and the satellite lists:

References